Romain Dedola (born 2 January 1989) is a French professional footballer who plays as a midfielder for Championnat National 3 club Hauts Lyonnais.

Career statistics

References

External links 
 
 
 

1989 births
Living people
People from Rillieux-la-Pape
French footballers
France youth international footballers
Association football midfielders
Ligue 2 players
2. Bundesliga players
Regionalliga players
3. Liga players
Championnat National 2 players
Championnat National 3 players
Olympique Lyonnais players
RC Strasbourg Alsace players
FC Ingolstadt 04 players
FC Ingolstadt 04 II players
SSV Jahn Regensburg players
GOAL FC players
Lyon La Duchère players
Ain Sud players
Hauts Lyonnais players
French expatriate footballers
Expatriate footballers in Germany
French expatriate sportspeople in Germany
Sportspeople from Lyon Metropolis
Footballers from Auvergne-Rhône-Alpes